Le bureau des gaffes en gros, written and drawn by Franquin and Jidéhem, is an  album of the original Gaston Lagaffe series, numbered R2. It is made up of 52 pages and was published by Dupuis. It consists of a series of one-strip gags.

Story
Gaston invents a robot and strange appeaux. Mademoiselle Jeanne appear for the first time.

Background
This album was first published  in the Italian format in 1965, under the title Gaffes en gros.
He was published at the casual format in 1972. It is made up of the gags first published in the album #4, plus gags previously unpublished in albums.

References

 Gaston Lagaffe classic series on the official website
 Publication in Spirou on bdoubliées.com.

External links
Official website 

1972 graphic novels
Comics by André Franquin